Veljko Maričić (23 March 1907 – 30 October 1973) was a Croatian actor. He appeared in more than fifteen films from 1944 to 1972.

Selected filmography

Awards
 Vladimir Nazor Award for theatre (1970)

References

External links 

1907 births
1973 deaths
Croatian male film actors
People from Sisak